Ravenea louvelii is a species of flowering plant in the  Arecaceae family. It is a palm endemic to Madagascar, where it is known from a single location. There are fewer than 10 individuals left. They are believed to be in Andasibe-Mantadia National Park on the Western margin of central Madagascar. They are protected by restriction of access to the location.

References

louvelii
Endemic flora of Madagascar
Critically endangered flora of Africa
Taxonomy articles created by Polbot
Taxa named by Henk Jaap Beentje